Mission: Impossible is an American television series that chronicles the missions of a team of secret American government agents known as the Impossible Missions Force (IMF). The show is a continuation of the 1966–1973 TV series of the same name. The only actor to return for the series as a regular cast member was Peter Graves who played Jim Phelps, although two other cast members from the original series (Greg Morris and Lynda Day George) returned as guest stars. The only other regular cast member (unseen) to return for every episode was the voice of "The Tape" (in this series, "The Disc"), Bob Johnson.

Plot
The events of the series take place 15 years after the last season of the original Mission: Impossible TV series. After his protégé and successor as leader of the top-secret Impossible Missions Force is killed, Jim Phelps is called out of retirement and asked to form a new IMF team and track down the assassin.

His team consists of:
 Nicholas Black, a disguise expert and actor.
 Max Harte, a strongman.
 Casey Randall, a model-turned-agent.
 Grant Collier, son of Barney Collier, IMF's original technology expert, and a technical genius in his own right.

After finding the killer, Jim decides to stay on and keep the team together. Midway through season 1, Casey is killed during a mission (becoming the first ongoing IMF agent to be disavowed on screen), and Secret Service agent Shannon Reed succeeds her for the remainder of the series. With the exception of this cast change, Phelps's team remains constant throughout the series.

Cast

Main cast

Guest cast
The revived series included special appearances by several 1960s–1970s IMF veterans, including appearances by Lynda Day George (George's character name Casey was here said to be her surname and she was given the first name Lisa, due to this version's first resident female operative being called Casey) and by Greg Morris as Barney Collier; the character played here by Morris's son, Phil Morris, was Grant Collier, Barney's son.

Production

Development
In 1988, the American fall television season was hampered by a writers' strike that prevented the commissioning of new scripts. Producers, anxious to provide new product for viewers but with the prospect of a lengthy strike, went into the vaults for previously written material. ABC decided to launch a new Mission: Impossible series, with a mostly new cast (except for Graves, who would return as Phelps), but using scripts from the original series, suitably updated. To save even more on production costs, the series was filmed in Australia; the first season in Queensland, and the second season in Melbourne. Costs in 1988 were some 20 percent lower in Australia compared with Hollywood. The new Mission: Impossible was one of the first American commercial network programs to be filmed in Australia. The show's core cast included several Australian actors, and numerous Australians (along with Australian-based American and British actors) were also cast in guest roles.

According to Patrick White's book, The Complete Mission Impossible Dossier, the original plan was for the series to be an actual remake/reimaginging of the original series, with the new cast playing the same characters from the original series: Rollin Hand, Cinnamon Carter, et al. Just before filming began, White writes, the decision was made to rework the characters so that they were now original creations, albeit still patterned after the originals, with only Jim Phelps remaining unchanged, and with the Collier character becoming the son of the original to take advantage of the fact the actor cast in the role, Phil Morris, is the son of Greg Morris, the actor who played Barney Collier. One of the reworked scripts incorporated a guest appearance by the elder Morris as Barney Collier.

The strike eventually ended and the series was able to compose original storylines. Ultimately only a few episodes ended up being outright remakes of the original series, including the show's premiere episode.

Cancellation
Originally, the show had aired on Sundays, and was moved to Saturday evenings starting with episode 9 of the first season. At the start of the second season, ABC moved the show to the Thursday 8:00 p.m. timeslot, which proved to be a disaster. Being forced to compete with NBC's The Cosby Show and A Different World, Mission: Impossibles ratings quickly declined. ABC responded by moving the show back to Saturday nights to replace the sitcoms Mr. Belvedere and Living Dolls, which faltered badly in their time slots. The move was not a success and the series was cancelled at the end of the second season.

Episodes

Season 1 (1988–89)

Season 2 (1989–90)

Formula
The formulaic episode structure from the original series was largely repeated, although the writers took some liberties and tried to stretch the rules somewhat. Most notably, by the time of the revival series, the Impossible Missions Force (which was originally suggested to be an independent agency) was no longer a small, clandestine operation, but larger in scale, with references now made to IMF divisions and additional teams similar to the one run by Phelps. The 1980s series also had IMF agents using technology that nearly pushed the series into the realm of science fiction, such as one gadget that could record dreams.

The disc scene
Instead of retrieving a tape recorder and an envelope of photos, Phelps would converse briefly with an undercover contact who directed him to the location of a small optical disc player with a thumbprint scanner built into its lid. After scanning the print, the device would open to reveal a video screen and a 12-button numeric keypad, on which Phelps would type in an access code. Doing so caused a panel to slide open, exposing both the disc and a pop-up insertion slot. Upon playing the disc, Phelps would see photos and video clips related to the mission and hear a voice describing it. As in the original, the voice would greet him with "Good morning, Jim." The series premiere, "The Killer", used "Welcome back, Jim"; and the series finale, "The Sands of Seth", used "Good afternoon, Jim." As in the original, the voice followed its description of the mission and goals with "Your mission, Jim, should you choose/decide to accept it" or words to that effect; it would also warn that "As always, should you or any of your I.M. Force be caught or killed, the Secretary will disavow any knowledge of your actions. This disc will self-destruct in five seconds. Good luck, Jim." Phelps would then close the lid and walk away as smoke began to emit from inside the case to indicate the disc's self-destruction, at which point the camera would freeze and zoom up as the show's logo was revealed and theme song played prior to the apartment scene.

These briefings were read by voice actor Bob Johnson in the original series and the 1988 revival but the identity of the character was never revealed, nor was his face ever shown. And despite being filmed in Australia, many episodes would show an establishing shot of either the San Francisco skyline or one of the city's famous landmarks before cutting to Phelps making his way to his contact to retrieve the disc player.

The first-season episode "Reprisal" includes a moment unique in Mission: Impossible in which Phelps, for the first time, is shown actually "rewinding" the message and playing back a portion of it before the disc self-destructs. This episode's disc scene—relating to Phelps being informed that an impersonator is killing former IMF agents and framing him for the murders—also includes a rare variant of the tape voice's admonition, this time informing Phelps, "Your mission, which I feel you must accept, will be to find the person who is framing you and stop him."

The apartment scene
The 1980s revival reinstated the "dossier scene" in the first episode when Phelps selected his new team. In keeping with the updated theme of the series, Phelps uses a computer system (hidden inside his coffee table) rather than folders of clippings and documents to make his decision (with Bob Johnson also providing the narration for the video clips of each IMF agent), but since he kept the same team in subsequent episodes no subsequent dossier scenes were made. Instead, subsequent episodes generally showed Phelps holding mission briefings with his team at his apartment, usually using his computer system to discuss with them some of the same information he got from the disc player.

The plan
In the 1980s revival, the mask-making process involved a digital camera and computer and was mostly automatic. Most episodes included a dramatic revelation  near the end in which the team member (usually Nicholas Black) would remove the mask.

Variations
In the 1980s series, former IMF agent Barney Collier was framed for a crime he didn't commit and the IMF team had to rescue him, leading to a reuniting of Barney with his son and IMF agent Grant Collier (in real life played by father-and-son Greg and Phil Morris).

Improvisation
In contrast to the original series, the 1980s missions often departed from the team's original plan, requiring the team to think on their feet and use their equipment in ways that had not originally been intended.

Conclusion
In the 1980s revival, this format was altered with the addition of a tag scene showing the IMF team regrouping (often still in disguise) and walking away from the site of their concluded mission, often accompanied by a quip uttered by Jim Phelps. Phelps is first shown uttering said quip in the episode "The Fixer", which was also the first episode featuring Shannon Reed as a full member.

Breaking the formula
Several episodes break the formula, the most notable being "The Fortune", an episode that aired midway through the first season and featured the death of Terry Markwell's character, Casey Randall. Casey became the first core IMF member to be killed off, and the discovery of her death by Phelps during a mission in progress leads to one IMF member, Max, openly questioning his ability to complete the mission, and Phelps reacting in anger when the culprit is captured (both of which were unprecedented moments for the franchise). "The Fortune" ends with a unique tag scene showing, for the first time, an IMF agent actually being disavowed. "The Fortune" is also the only episode in Mission: Impossible history to be a "changeover" episode as it introduces Casey's successor, Shannon Reed (played by Jane Badler), who helps bring Casey's killer to justice.

Broadcast history

Home media

CBS DVD (distributed by Paramount) has released the entire series on DVD in region 1.

In region 2, Revelation Films released Mission: Impossible – The '88 TV Season on July 23, 2012 and The '89 TV Season on October 15, 2012.

References

External links

1988 American television series debuts
1990 American television series endings
Mission: Impossible television series
American Broadcasting Company original programming
American action television series
Television series by CBS Studios
Espionage television series
American sequel television series
English-language television shows
1980s American crime television series
1990s American crime television series
Television shows filmed in Australia